Dead Rising: Watchtower is a 2015 American action zombie film directed by Zach Lipovsky, produced by Tomas Harlan and Tim Carter, and written by Tim Carter. The film stars Jesse Metcalfe, Dennis Haysbert, Virginia Madsen, Meghan Ory, Keegan Connor Tracy, and Rob Riggle. It is based on the video game of the same name. Principal photography began on September 30, 2014, in Vancouver, British Columbia, Canada. Legendary Pictures produced the picture as its first digital film through its Legendary Digital Media division and it was released on Crackle on March 27, 2015.

Plot
Set between the events of Dead Rising 2 and Dead Rising 3, the story follows online reporter Chase Carter and his camerawoman Jordan as they cover the stories of the people inside of the walled-in quarantined area in the fictional town of East Mission, Oregon, as the government (running an organization called FEZA—Federal Emergency Zombie Agency) attempts to contain a viral outbreak that turns people into ravenous zombies.

An anti-viral drug called Zombrex, which keeps the virus at bay, is being administered to those infected. When it becomes clear that the drug is no longer effective and a zombie outbreak purges the town and infects its inhabitants, Chase, Jordan, grieving mother Maggie, and survivor Crystal battle their way out of the city before it gets firebombed.

Throughout the film, it is revealed that the Army implanted defective Zombrex drugs in a refugee center to start another outbreak so that the government can be allowed to plant government-mandated Zombrex chips on the infected to track them, framing FEZA for giving bad Zombrex to the infected. The coin that Jordan gave to Chase to open a newspaper vending machine at the beginning came in handy when she placed evidence of the Army sabotaging the Zombrex inside the vending machine for him to find.

When General Lyons figures out that Jordan and Norton are aware of the Army's actions, he has his men capture them to cover up the truth. In the end, Chase and Crystal manage to survive and get out of city, and Jordan manages to get footage proving the Army's complicity in the new outbreak to Chase, who finds it in the newspaper vending machine; the same footage shows her being taken into custody by the U.S. government, who then implant tracking devices on people who are infected.

Cast
 Jesse Metcalfe as Chase Carter
 Meghan Ory as Crystal O'Rourke
 Virginia Madsen as Maggie
 Keegan Connor Tracy as Jordan Blair
 Aleks Paunovic as Logan
 Dennis Haysbert as General Lyons
 Gary Jones as Norton
 Carrie Genzel as Susan Collier
 Rob Riggle as Frank West. A photographer and former survivor of the Willamette Mall Outbreak. The character had previously appeared within the games: Frank is the main protagonist of Dead Rising, Dead Rising 4, Dead Rising 2: Case West, and Dead Rising 2: Off the Record.
 Reese Alexander as Shearson
 Harley Morenstein as Pyro
 Julia Benson as Amy
 Peter Benson as Bruce
 C. Ernst Harth as Bonzo Zombie
 Jen and Sylvia Soska as Zombies (cameo; uncredited)
 Ryan Connolly as Zombie (for Film Riot episode; uncredited)
 Patrick Sabongui as Hippie Zombrex Doctor

Production

Development 
On June 19, 2014, it was announced that Legendary Pictures' Legendary Digital Media would develop its first digital feature film based on the video game Dead Rising, Lorenzo di Bonaventura would executive produce, Tim Carter would write and produce with Tomas Harlan through their Contradiction Films. The film is not a part of Legendary's 5-year deal with Universal Pictures. Instead, Crackle would handle domestic rights of the film and which would be distributed internationally by Content Media Corp, and it would also be released on SVOD, DVD, VOD and TV after its exclusive stream on Crackle. On August 20, visual effects artist Zach Lipovsky was set to direct the film.

On September 29, the official title was confirmed as Dead Rising: Watchtower and the cast announced including Jesse Metcalfe, Dennis Haysbert, Virginia Madsen and Meghan Ory. More cast joined on October 20, including Rob Riggle, Harley Morenstein, Keegan Connor Tracy and Aleks Paunovic. Riggle would play Frank West, a photojournalist who knows how to survive zombie attacks, Genzel plays Susan, the anchorwoman who interviews Frank West, Paunovic would play Logan, the head of a biker gang, Morenstein would play his second-in-command, Pyro, while Tracy would play the role of a straight-laced journalist.

Filming
The principal photography on the film began in Vancouver, British Columbia, on September 30, 2014. On October 21, a photo from the set was revealed by Crackle.

Release
The film premiered on Crackle on March 27, 2015.

Critical reception
Neil Genzlinger of The New York Times wrote that the film may be rewarding for fans of the video game but is otherwise "a time waster devoid of the wit and depth of other walking-dead fare currently available". Pat Torfe of Bloody Disgusting wrote that the film adheres too closely to the video game for non-fans to enjoy. Gareth Jones of Dread Central rated it 3.5/5 stars and called it respectful enough of the genre to draw in non-fans. Jones and Torfe both praised Riggle's acting, but Genzlinger said that it should have been funnier than it was.

Sequel

Dead Rising: Endgame, a sequel was announced for Spring 2016 on Crackle with Jesse Metcalfe, Keegan Connor Tracy and Dennis Haysbert reprising their roles from the first film and Sabongui returning in a new role as a skilled zombie killer and video game aficionado who talks a big and crude game to mask his gentle side. New to the cast are Billy Zane as Rand, a handsome, cruel scientist who was hired by the government to find a cure for the raging zombie infection but instead is conducting horrendous experiments on the infected, Marie Avgeropoulos as Sandra Lowe, a skilled computer hacker and Chase’s on-and-off girlfriend who joins him in his quest to battle the zombie-infested underground and stop General Lyons’ plan, Ian Tracey as George Hancock, the courageous whistleblower who compels Chase and his team to enter a zombie-infested city on a rescue mission, Jessica Harmon as Jill, a news producer who joins Chase and his intrepid crew to infiltrate a secret laboratory and stop the carnage, Victor Webster as Dead Rising 2 hero Chuck Greene and Camille Sullivan as Susan Ingot, the CEO of Phenotrans, the manufacturer of Zombrex, the vaccine that keeps the zombie infection at bay.

References

External links
 
 
 
 

2015 films
2015 horror films
2015 action thriller films
American action thriller films
American zombie films
American sequel films
Dead Rising
Live-action films based on video games
Films shot in Vancouver
Legendary Pictures films
Films based on Capcom video games
2010s English-language films
2010s American films